Frank Mancuso (1918–2007) was a baseball player and politician.

Frank Mancuso may also refer to:
Frank Mancuso Sr. (born 1933), film executive
Frank Mancuso Jr. (born 1958), film producer